Srul Bronshtein (–1943) was a Romanian and Soviet Yiddish-language poet.

Biography
Srul Bronshtein was born into a Jewish baker's family in the village of Ştefăneşti, Bessarabia Governorate — at the time a southwestern province of Imperial Russia (Ştefăneşti is currently in Floreşti district, Moldova). As a child, he received a traditional cheder education.

In the 1930s, Bronshtein lived in Bucharest, where he debuted with poetry and critical essays in the Yiddish-language literary periodicals of Romania. Among other magazines, he published in Di Vokh ("The Week"), edited by prose writer Moyshe Altman, and in Shoybn ("Windows"), edited by the poet and theatrical director Yankev Shternberg. Shternberg organized a circle of Yiddish literati, predominantly from Bessarabia, which in addition to Srul Bronshtein included poets Tzvi Tzelman, Zishe Bagish and prose writers Ikhil Shraybman, Arn Ocnitzer, Azriel Roitman, among others.

It was in Bucharest that Bronshtein's first collection of Yiddish verse was published in 1938, entitled Moldove, mayn heym ("Moldavia, my home"). It was followed by the second collection Kh'ob geefnt breyt di toyern ("I've opened wide the gates") a year later. A large selection of his poetry appeared in the Yiddish-language periodicals of Bucharest throughout the 1930s, including Shpitol-Lider ("Hospital poems"), Fabrik-Lider ("Factory poems"), Tfise-Lider ("Prison poems"), the ballad Malkutse Der Gasnfroys Farveynt Harts ("The cried-out heart of the street girl Malcuţa"), and a long poem, Banakhtike Asfalt-Leygers ("Nocturnal Asphalt Pavers").

In 1940 Bessarabia was annexed by the Soviet Union, and Bronshtein, as with almost all other Bessarabian writers, moved back home. Later in World War II, he was mobilized into the Red Army at the outbreak of the German invasion (June 1941) and suffered a penetrating lung wound from shrapnel the following year. Bronshtein died of the wound in winter 1943 at a military hospital in Tashkent, Uzbek SSR (present-day Uzbekistan).

Despite his humble, provincial background, Bronshtein's poetics are pointedly urbane, with typical modernistic themes of anomie,

Published works
 Moldove, mayn heym: lider un poemen (מאָלדאָװע, מײַן הײם; "Moldova, my home: verses and long poems"), illustrated by А. Lebas, Bucharest, 1938 Harvard University Library, under Brunstein, S.
 Kh'ob geefnt breyt di toyern (כ'האָב געעפֿנט ברײט די טױערן; "I've opened wide the gates", poetry), Bucharest, 1939

Critical works about Bronshtein
Ikhil Shraybman, Zibn yor mit zibn khadoshim (יחיאל שרײַבמאַן, זיבן יאָר מיט זיבן חדשים; "Seven years with seven months, an autobiographic novel"), Yiddish and Russian; Chapter 6: biographical information on Srul Bronshtein), Editura Ruxandra, Chişinău, 2003
 Sarah Shpitalnik, Bessarabskiy Stil''' (Сара Шпитальник, Бессарабский стиль''; "Bessarabian style"), Russian-language bibliographic information on Bessarabian Yiddish authors, Editura Ruxandra, Chişinău, 2005

References

See related Russian-language articles
 Цельман, Цви — Zvi Tzelman
 Шрайбман, Ихил Ицикович — Ikhil Shraybman
 Окницер, Арн — Arn Ocnitzer

1910s births
1943 deaths
People from Florești District
People from Bessarabia Governorate
Moldovan Jews
Bessarabian Jews
Yiddish-language poets
Modernist poets
Romanian poets
Romanian male poets
Soviet people of World War II
Soviet poets
Soviet male writers
20th-century Romanian male writers
Romanian emigrants to the Soviet Union
Jewish Romanian writers
Soviet military personnel killed in World War II